The University of Virginia School of Medicine (UVA SoM) is the graduate medical school of the University of Virginia. The school's facilities are on the University of Virginia grounds adjacent to Academical Village in Charlottesville, Virginia. Founded in 1819 by Thomas Jefferson, UVA SoM is the tenth oldest medical school in the United States, and is ranked 31st in research-oriented medical schools by U.S. News & World Report, and as of 2021, is ranked nineteenth in the nation in primary care. The School of Medicine confers Doctor of Medicine (M.D.) and Doctor of Philosophy (PhD) degrees, and is closely associated with both the University of Virginia Health System and Inova Health System.

History 

The UVA Health System's history can be traced to the original conception of the University of Virginia on August 1, 1818, whereupon Thomas Jefferson, James Madison, and twenty-one other men first compiled a report for the Virginia State Legislature to determine a site, building plans, and courses for study for the University of Virginia. Acknowledging that clinical lectures and medical training were not available in Charlottesville at that time, Jefferson and his colleagues determined that the university should offer education in "the elements of medical science...with a history and explanation of all its successive theories from Hippocrates to the present day," as a way to train both prospective physicians, as well as those students with a more dilettante interest in medicine.

At the first meeting of the university's Board of Visitors in 1819, a School of Medicine was authorized. The School of Medicine – the 10th medical school in the U.S. – officially opened in March 1825 with a single professor, Dr. Robley Dunglison. Dunglison had been actively recruited by Thomas Jefferson, and had traveled from London to take up his new position.

Just weeks before Dunglison and his wife arrived in the United States, Jefferson had written to Joseph C. Cabell that an anatomical theater would be "indispensable to the school of anatomy," and that "there cannot be a single dissection until a proper theater is prepared giving an advantageous view of the operation to those within, and effectually excluding observation from without." This structure, which was eventually demolished in 1938, was one of the first of its kind in the entire United States, conceived and blueprinted by Jefferson himself, who pushed fervently for its construction up until the time of his death in 1825.

The University of Virginia School of Medicine graduated its first four students in 1828, and in 1832, became the first medical school in the United States to standardize the criteria for admission.

More than 75 years later, UVA opened its first hospital in March 1901 with 25 beds and three operating rooms. Just as medical education has been a part of UVA since its founding, so too has medical literature – the 8,000 books purchased by Jefferson to create the University Library included 710 books on the medical sciences. UVA's medical literature moved to the UVA Medical School building in 1929. Its current home was dedicated in April 1976.

In 2016, UVA announced a partnership with Inova Fairfax to establish a satellite campus at the flagship Inova hospital in Northern Virginia. This agreement also included the establishment of a personal genomics center and a collaboration between the cancer centers of the two entities.

Historical Timeline 
 1826 – Anatomical Hall designed and built by Jefferson.
 1828 – First University degrees awarded to four medical graduates.
 1892 – Medical course lengthened to two years.
 1895 – Medical course extended to three years.
 1898 – Medical course lengthened to four years.
 1901 – Opening of the University of Virginia Hospital (25 beds). Dr. Paul Barringer named superintendent.
 1905 – Richard Henry Whitehead, M.D., LL.D., dean of the University of North Carolina School of Medicine named first dean of the University of Virginia School of Medicine. Whitehead reorganized the hospital to a primarily teaching facility. He emphasized scholarship and basic science well in advance of the Flexner Report.
 1924 – First Woman Graduate (and only in that year), Lila Morse Bonner (later married name Lila Bonner Miller, MD). 
 1929 – New medical school building opened (cost $1.4 million).
 1960 – West Complex expanded into new hospital, completed at a cost of $6.5 million.
 1989 – University of Virginia Replacement Hospital (556 beds) was dedicated, at a cost of $230 million.
 2014 – Medical school curriculum updated to system-based instruction, and classroom program shortened to 1.5 years.

Reputation
In 2021, U.S. News & World Report ranked the UVA School of Medicine 29th in the nation for research and 6th for primary care. UVA is one of just five schools in the mid-Atlantic region, including Johns Hopkins University, Duke University, and University of North Carolina at Chapel Hill, to be included in the Top 30 in the research category.

Facilities 

The School of Medicine is affiliated with the University of Virginia Health System.

The UVA Hospital is a large tertiary care hospital with more than 500 beds, not including a 45-bed neonatal intensive care unit and 20-bed nursery. The Children's Hospital is served by the Newborn Emergency Transport System (NETS), which transports critically ill newborns and pediatrics from all over the surrounding area and states back to UVA. The hospital is a Level I trauma center and is accessible by ambulance as well as Pegasus, UVA Health System's air and ground transport service for critically ill and injured patients. As an academic medical center, patients at UVA are treated by physicians who are also faculty members at the UVA School of Medicine.

The Claude Moore Health Sciences Library serves the School of Medicine and the Health System and is located within the Medical Center.

From years 2016–2019, UVA Hospital was named the number 1 hospital in Virginia.

Clinical education 
UVA utilizes a unique "Next Generation" integrated curriculum that allows medical students to spend more time in the clinic by condensing the first 2 years of classes into 1.5 years. Students then take Step 1 before entering the clinic in the spring of their second year. UVA features accredited programs (via the Accreditation Council for Graduate Medical Education) of resident and fellowship education in general, specialty, and subspecialty fields.

Research 
UVA has many highly regarded departments with over 300 labs; laboratories are mainly housed in Medical Center in Pinn Hall, MR-4, MR-5, MR-6, and the West Complex (Hospital West).
 
In 1889, philanthropist Oliver Hazard Payne bequeathed a $100,000 grant to the medical school, to help establish laboratories of experimental medicine.

Founded in 1967, the Department of Perceptual Studies is unusual in that it is one of the few academic research groups in the field of "supernatural phenomena" with board-certified physicians and scientists at a respected university.

Notable discoveries 
 1928 – 1952 – Sidney William Britton, Ph.D., professor of physiology and Herbert Silvette, Ph.D., professor of pharmacology, demonstrated that the adrenal cortex contained a hormone, not epinephrine, which influenced carbohydrate storage and metabolism.
 1935 – 1967 – Alfred Chanutin, Ph.D., professor and chair of biochemistry, discovered the role of red blood cell 2,3-diphosphoglycerate (2,3-DPG) in oxygen transfer from hemoglobin. This finding had enormous impact on the preservation of blood for transfusion therapy.
 1939 – Dupont Guerry III, M.D. intern, and William Wirt Waddell Jr., a pediatrician, discovered the role of vitamin K in the etiology, treatment, and prevention of hypoprothrombinemia and hemorrhagic disease of the newborn.
 1966 – 1988 – Robert M. Berne, M.D., professor and chair of physiology, pioneered adenosine in cardiovascular function and introduced adenosine as a therapeutic agent in the treatment of supraventricular tachycardia.
 1971 – 1981 – Alfred G. Gilman, M.D., Ph.D., professor of pharmacology discovered G-proteins, cellular mediators of hormone action, for which he received the 1989 Albert Lasker Award and the 1994 Nobel Prize in Physiology or Medicine.
 1970 – 1983 – Ferid Murad, M.D., PhD, professor of medicine, discovered that endothelium-derived relaxing factor is nitric oxide, which acts as a vasodilator by stimulating guanylyl cyclase. Murad received the Albert Lasker Award in 1996 and the Nobel Prize in Medicine or Physiology in 1998 for this discovery.
 1976 – Michael O. Thorner, M.B.B.S., D.Sc., professor of medicine, discovered a new hypothalamic hormone, growth hormone releasing hormone. Thorner received the 1995 NIH General Clinical Research Centers Award for his work in clinical neuroendocrinology.
 1995 – Barry Marshall, M.B.B.S., Associate Professor of Internal Medicine, received the Albert Lasker Award Medicine for his discovery that the bacterium Helicobacter pylori is the cause of peptic ulcer disease and also is associated with gastric carcinoma.

Research Centers and Core facilities

Research Centers
 The UVA Cancer Center is headed by Thomas P. Loughran Jr. and was ranked in 2016 by U.S. News & World Report as one of the top 2–3% of cancer specialty centers nationwide.
 The Carter Immunology Center is one of the largest research centers in the School of Medicine with over 50 faculty members. 
 Cardiovascular Research Center
 The Center for Brain Immunology & Glia is a group of labs in the Department of Neuroscience. In recent years, BIG has been one of UVA's most productive collaborative research centers, with research being nominated for Science's Breakthrough of the Year. Notable discoveries as of late include discovering a link between the brain and the immune system, identifying major genetic causes of schizophrenia, and a link between the immune system and social behavior.
 The Center for Diabetes Technology has been the subject of publicity for its role in the development of the artificial pancreas, a major breakthrough in the treatment of type 1 diabetes.
 Thaler Center for AIDS and HIV Research

Notable faculty

The faculty of the School of Medicine are recognized nationally and internationally. The faculty includes 15 elected members of the Institute of Medicine and National Academy of Sciences; three members of the American Academy of Arts and Sciences; 12 members of the American Association for the Advancement of Science; five recipients of the Virginia Outstanding Faculty Award; four recipients of the Virginia Outstanding Scientist Award; and two recipients of the Virginia Life Achievement Award in Science.

Notable alumni

Deans of the School of Medicine

 indicates interim Dean.

Medical Scientist Training Program
The University of Virginia School of Medicine is one of only 43 NIH funded MD/PhD programs in the country. The program director is Dr. Dean H. Kedes.

History
According to the handbook provided to all entering students:  As such the program claims two founding dates: 1971 when the MSTP committee was first formed and 1977 when the first students matriculated.

Program Directors

See also 
 List of University of Virginia people
 List of medical schools
 University of Virginia Health System

References

External links

 School of Medicine Home Page
 Admissions Office
 About the SOM
 Biomedical Sciences Graduate Programs
 Fellowship Programs
 Graduate Medical Education
 Financial Aid Office
 Continuing Medical Education
 Division of Perceptual Studies
 Research Core Facilities, Institutes, Centers, & Other Programs
 Journey Through Time: An Online Scrapbook for UVA School of Medicine and School of Nursing Alumni

Medicine, School of
Medical schools in Virginia
University of Virginia School of Medicine faculty
Educational institutions established in 1819
1819 establishments in Virginia